The 1936–37 season was the 45th season of The Football League.

First Division

Results

Maps

Second Division

Results

Maps

Third Division North

Results

Maps

Third Division South

Results

Maps

See also
1936–37 in English football
1936 in association football
1937 in association football

References

Ian Laschke: Rothmans Book of Football League Records 1888–89 to 1978–79. Macdonald and Jane’s, London & Sydney, 1980.

English Football League seasons
Eng
1936–37 in English football leagues